This is a list of newspapers in South Carolina, United States.

Current news publications
The following is a list of current (print and web-based) news publications published in the U.S. state of South Carolina.

Defunct

 18th century
Charleston
Newspapers published in Charleston, South Carolina:

 The Charleston Evening Gazette.  D., T.W., July 11, 1785- Oct. 18, 1786.
 The Charleston Morning Post, and Daily Advertiser. D., Jan. 18, 1786-Nov. 5, 1787.
 Charlestown Gazette. W., Aug. (?), 1778-Jan. 18, 1780.
 The Chronicle of Liberty, or, the Republican Intelligencer. W., Mar. 25, 1783.
 The City Gazette & Daily Advertiser. D., Jan. 2, 1792- Dec. 31, 1800+
 The City Gazette, and the Daily Advertiser. D., Nov. 6- Dec. 17, 1787.
 The City Gazette or, the Daily Advertiser. D., Dec. 18, 1787-Jan. 1, 1792.

 The Columbian Herald & Daily Advertiser. T.W., Sept. 1792- 1793(?).
 Columbian Herald, and the General Advertiser. T.W., 1792(?)-July 25 (?), 1793.
 The Columbian Herald, or, the Independent Courier of North-America. S.W., T.W., Nov. 24, 1785-Sometime After June 28, 1791.
 Columbian Herald, or, the New Daily Advertiser. D., Oct. 3, 1795-Dec. 17, 1796.
 The Columbian Herald, or, the Patriotic Courier of North- America. S.W., Nov. 23, 1784-Nov. 21, 1785.
 Columbian Herald, or, the Southern Star. T.W., July 27, 1793-September (?), 1795.
 The Daily Evening Gazette and Charleston Tea-Table Companion. D., Jan. 3, 1795-Feb. 18, 1795.
 Evening Vesper Courier. S.W., July 31-Nov. 16, 1798.
 Federal Carolina Gazette. W., Jan. 2(?)-Dec. 25, 1800.
 The Gazette of the State of South-Carolina. W., S.W., Apr. 9, 1777-Mar. 24, 1785.
 The Royal Gazette. S.W. Mar. 3, 1781-Sept. 28, 1782.
 The Royal South-Carolina Gazette. T.W., S.W., June 1(?), 1780-Sept. 12, 1782.
 The South-Carolina and American General Gazette. W., S.W., Apr. 4, 1764-Feb. 28, 1781.
 The South-Carolina Gazette. W., Jan. 8, 1732-Dec. 18, 1775.
 South-Carolina Gazette; and Country Journal. W., Dec. 31, 1765-Aug. 1, 1775.

 South-Carolina Gazette, and General Advertiser. S.W., T.W., Mar. 15, 1783-Oct. 23, 1784.
 The South-Carolina Gazette, and Public Advertiser. S.W., Mar. 3, 1784-July 9, 1785.
 The South-Carolina Gazette, and the General Advertiser. S.W., Jan. 7-14, 1786.
 The South-Carolina Gazette and the Public Advertiser. T.W., S.W., July 12, 1785-Jan. 4, 1786.
 South Carolina State Gazette and Daily Advertiser. D., Nov. 30, 1784-July 26, 1785.
 South Carolina State Gazette, and General Advertiser. T.W., Oct. 26-Nov. 27, 1784.
 South-Carolina State-Gazette & Timothy & Mason's Daily Advertiser. D., Jan. 1, 1794-Dec. 31, 1797.
 South-Carolina State Gazette, and Timmothy's Daily Advertiser. D., Jan. 1, 1798-Dec., 31, 1800+
 The South-Carolina Gazetteer; and Country Journal. . W., Dec. 17-24, 1765.
 The South-Carolina Weekly Advertiser. W., Feb. 19-Apr. 23, 1783.
 The South-Carolina Weekly Gazette. W., Nov. 22 (?), 1758- Mar. 28, 1764.
 South-Carolina Weekly Gazette. W., Feb. 15, 1783-Feb. 27, 1784.
 The State Gazette of South-Carolina. S.W., T.W., Mar. 28, 1785-Dec. 31, 1793.
 The Telegraphe, and Charleston Daily Advertiser. D., Mar. 16-20, 1795.

 Columbia
Newspapers published in Columbia, South Carolina:

 The Columbia Gazette. W., Jan. 28, 1794-Dec. 9, 1794.
 South Carolina Gazette. W., Mar. (?), 1792-Sept. 3, 1793.

Georgetown
Newspapers published in Georgetown, South Carolina:

 The South-Carolina Independent Gazette; and Georgetown Chronicle. W., Apr. 2, 1791-1796(?).

See also
 South Carolina media
 List of newspapers in South Carolina in the 18th century
 List of radio stations in South Carolina
 List of television stations in South Carolina
 Media of locales in South Carolina: Charleston, Columbia, Greenville
 Journalism:
 :Category:Journalists from South Carolina
 University of South Carolina School of Journalism and Mass Communications, in Columbia 
 South Carolina literature

References

Bibliography
 
  (+ List of titles 50+ years old)
 
 
 
  (Includes information about weekly rural newspapers in South Carolina)
 
 Patricia G. McNeely. Palmetto Press: The History of South Carolina’s Newspapers and the Press Association. South Carolina Press Association, 1998.
 

External links

 
  (Directory ceased in 2017)
 
 
 
  (Includes South Carolina newspapers)